Mr. Nice Guy (一個好人, LSHK Jat1 go3 hou2 jan4) is a 1997 Hong Kong action comedy film directed by Sammo Hung and starring Jackie Chan and Richard Norton. Hung cameos as an unfortunate cyclist. The film was released in Hong Kong on 31 January 1997.

Mr. Nice Guy features a collaboration between Chan and Norton, reuniting them for the first time since 1993's City Hunter. Set in Melbourne, Australia, it is Chan's first film to be scripted and shot in English.

Plot
Television journalist Diana records footage of a cocaine deal gone wrong between the Italian mob and a street gang called The Demons. During the deal, mob boss Giancarlo kills the Demons' leader Grank and a gun fight ensues. Giancarlo spots Diana and her partner Richard and orders his gang to chase them. Richard is captured while Diana flees from the mobsters, bumping into TV chef Jackie, who helps her escape. During the chase, she accidentally switches the videotape of the drug trade with one of Jackie's cooking videos. Jackie brings the tape to his adoptive brother Romeo, a police officer. Romeo's children watch the video, unaware of what it is and that their father is investigating the mob. The mob force Richard to give them Diana's address. They ambush Diana at her house and kidnap her when they realize the tapes were switched and Jackie has the tape they want. Diana escapes after creating a distraction in front of a crowd. 

The mob believes Jackie has the tape and follows him around, while some Demons follow them, hoping for a chance to kill some of the mobsters in retaliation for killing Grank. Jackie is forced to fend them off and run when they attack him at a benefit event he is hosting at the mall. Puzzled at the mobsters' actions, one of the Demons asks a mobster why they are chasing Jackie. Jackie learns why the mob is chasing him after Diana sneaks into his house searching for the tape. She is attacked by Jackie's friend Lakeisha, who thinks her an intruder, but Jackie intervenes. Diana begs for the tape, but Jackie is convinced that he does not have it. Before Diana can leave Jackie's apartment building, Giancarlo's henchmen show up, unaware that Demon members have been following them.

Jackie and the women escape from the roof just as the Demons throw grenades in Jackie's apartment, killing the mobsters and blowing up Jackie's apartment. The Demons realize afterwards that was Jackie's apartment, and how serious Giancarlo is about retrieving the videotape. They decide to exploit the situation in order to extort money from Giancarlo. They call Giancarlo to set up a meeting to trade the tape and the mob's stolen cocaine for a large sum of money. Everyone decides to stay at Lakeisha's home for safety, but the Demons soon find them. They kidnap Jackie's girlfriend Miki (Miki Lee) and give Jackie a cell phone, demanding that he give them the videotape in 12 hours. Jackie turns to Romeo for the police's help. The next day, Jackie goes to meet the Demons to trade in a decoy videotape, but no Demon meets Jackie in person. Instead, they frequently call him on his cell phone and make him go to various locations in the city.

The police trace each call, but discover the Demons are trying to thwart their presence, so they follow Jackie instead. However, the gang discovers this and they escape with Miki. Jackie, angry at the cops' mishandling, refuses to work with them anymore. However, he is kidnapped by the Demons moments later. Jackie fights off the gang and causes their van to crash. Before the police show up, Jackie forces one of the Demons to tell him where Miki is: at a construction site. Jackie insists to Diana and Lakeisha not to follow him to the construction site, but they go there anyway. While Jackie looks for Miki, Giancarlo and his men show up. A fight ensues between Jackie and the mobsters, which ends in Jackie getting captured. Lakeisha and Miki are also taken, while Diana is injured but escapes. Giancarlo murders the other Demons on site except for Tara, who also escapes but with serious injuries.

Meanwhile, Romeo discovers his son watching Diana's tape, the proof he needs to arrest the mob, and visits the hospital where Diana and Tara are being treated. The women inform him about what happened to Jackie and the others. At Giancarlo's home, Giancarlo demands the tape from Jackie one last time. Jackie decides to call Romeo, but he is not home. Afterwards Jackie is forced into an unfair fight with Giancarlo. After taking a beating, Giancarlo orders his men to kill Jackie and the women at "the guesthouse", which is code for a mining site used by Giancarlo where he buries people alive. However, they escape and destroy Giancarlo's home by driving through it in a 120-ton mining vehicle, which also causes cocaine to be spread outside in view of the police. The authorities arrive with Romeo, but they decide to state that they did not witness anything and that it was just another gang battle, so that Jackie can go free while the mobsters are arrested for possession of cocaine.

Cast
 Jackie Chan as Jackie 
 Richard Norton as Giancarlo's Luchetti
 Miki Lee as Miki 
 Karen McLymont as Lakeisha
 Gabrielle Fitzpatrick as Diana 
 Vince Poletto as Romeo 
 Barry Otto as Baggio 
 Sammo Hung as Cyclist
 Emil Chau as Ice Cream Vendor 
 Joyce Godenzi as Cook Show Audience (as Mina Godenzi)
 Peter Houghton as Richard 
 Peter Lindsay as "Grank", Demon Gang Leader 
 David No as Victor
 Rachel Blakely as Sandy, Demon Gang Member
 Aaron Notarfrancesco as Sonny 
 Jake Notarfrancesco as Nancy 
 Greg Jamieson as Priest 
 Matthew Dyktynski as Cooking Show Floor Manager 
 Salik Silverstein as Cooking Show Director 
 Lynne Murphy as The Babysitter 
 Carla Bonner as Cameo Role
 Karl Ajami as Giancarlo's Goon #1
 Brad Allan as Giancarlo's Goon #2 (as Bradley Allan)
 Paul Andreovski as Giancarlo's Goon #3
 Habby Heske as Giancarlo's Goon #4
 Cameron Douglas as Giancarlo's Goon #5
 Grant Page as Giancarlo's Goon #6
 Paul Douglas as Giancarlo's Goon #7
 David Baldwin as Giancarlo's Goon #8
 Brent Houghton as Giancarlo's Goon #9
 Ian Mall as Giancarlo's #10
 Dennis Christensen as Giancarlo's Goon #11
 Michael John Noonan as Giancarlo's Goon #12
 Darko Tuskan as Giancarlo's Goon #13
 John Raaen as Giancarlo's Goon #14
 Gary Shambrooke as Giancarlo's Goon #15
 Andy Cheng as Giancarlo's Goon at Construction Site (extra) (uncredited)
 Mars as Extra (uncredited)
 Frederick Miragliotta as Captain Morrison
 Nai Su Rak as Female in Chinatown (extra) (uncredited)
 Phillip Hobden as Male Police Officer (extra) (uncredited) 
 Graham Pearson as Male Police Officer (extra) (uncredited) 
 Doug Selby as Male Police Officer (extra) (uncredited)

Jackie Chan Stunt Team
 Brad Allan
 Chan Man-Ching
 Andy Cheng
 Rocky Lai
 Nicky Li
 Mars
 Lee Seung Hoon

Production
The film was originally going to be the fifth film in Jackie Chan's Police Story film series, with its setting in Sydney, Australia, but in a month's time it was revised to become a stand-alone action film set in Melbourne. It is Chan's first film to be scripted and shot in English.

According to his book I Am Jackie Chan: My Life in Action, Chan hurt his neck when he messed up on a flip during a fight scene. He also broke his nose during filming.

Box office
Mr. Nice Guy opened on Chinese New Year, 1997, against director Hung's own Once Upon a Time in China and America. Both were box office successes, but Mr. Nice Guy was the bigger of the two. It made HK$45,420,457 during its Hong Kong run. In Taipei, Taiwan, Mr. Nice Guy grossed NT$43.1 million and sold 201,407 tickets in 1997. In China, it grossed  at the box office. In South Korea, it sold 702,027 tickets and grossed . In Japan, it earned  at the box office.

In North America, Mr. Nice Guy was released by New Line Cinema on 20 March 1998 in 1,463 theatres. In its opening weekend, it grossed US$5,250,704 ($3,588 per screen) on its way to a total of US$12,716,953, equivalent to $26,016,998 adjusted for inflation in 2021. In Europe, the film sold 912,178 tickets. The film grossed  in international territories outside of North America, for a total of  grossed worldwide, equivalent to $64,824,555 adjusted for inflation in 2021.

Reception

On Rotten Tomatoes the film has an aggregated review score of 43% based on 30 critic reviews.

Accolades
1997 Golden Horse Film Festival
Winner: Best Action Direction (Wing Cho)
1998 Hong Kong Film Awards
Nomination: Best Action Choreography (Wing Cho)

New Line Cinema edit and DVD releases
For US$6 million, New Line Cinema acquired from Golden Harvest the international distribution rights to the film outside of Asia. The film received a partial dub, a new score, and more than 13 minutes of cuts were made. Most of the cuts were bits of violence (violence against women in particular), and cuts for pacing. Many scenes were also rearranged. The most noticeable scene rearrangement are the opening scenes of Giancarlo killing Tina and Jackie's cooking show. The original version opens with Giancarlo killing Tina, then Jackie's cooking show, but New Line Cinema's edit opens the other way around, giving the movie a more "lighter" tone from the start.

There are also differences between the Hong Kong and the Japanese versions of the film. The only scene cut from the Hong Kong version is the entirety of a dinner scene featuring Jackie, Romeo, Baggio, Lakiesha, Sonny, and Nancy (Romeo's children). The Japanese version contains this scene in its entirety, whereas the New Line Cinema edit contains most of this scene, but with a few cuts.

Various DVD versions of this film have been made. The Warner Brothers Japanese R2 version is the only version available with the original English dialog and the fully uncut version (the Japanese edit). However, the picture is non-anamorphic and has no English subtitles. The Taiwan Funny version has the New Line Cinema and Taiwanese versions, but the latter is dubbed in Mandarin. The HK version is similar to the Taiwanese, but dubbed in Cantonese. Both dubbed Asian versions refer to the Demons as the "Wolves," although in the end credits the actors are credited as "Demons."

In September 2019, Warner Archive Collection announced that it would release the film on Blu-ray, including the original uncut version newly remastered in HD sourced from a 4K scan of the original camera negative, in addition to the original New Line cut. The Blu-ray was released on 29 October 2019.

References

External links

1997 films
1997 action comedy films
1990s chase films
1990s martial arts comedy films
1990s English-language films
English-language Hong Kong films
Films about organised crime in Australia
Films directed by Sammo Hung
Films scored by J. Peter Robinson
Films set in Melbourne
Golden Harvest films
Hong Kong action comedy films
Hong Kong martial arts comedy films
1990s Hong Kong films